The helicoid, also known as helical surface, after the plane and the catenoid, is the third minimal surface to be known.

Description
It was described by Euler in 1774 and by Jean Baptiste Meusnier in 1776. Its name derives from its similarity to the helix: for every point on the helicoid, there is a helix contained in the helicoid which passes through that point. Since it is considered that the planar range extends through negative and positive infinity, close observation shows the appearance of two parallel or mirror planes in the sense that if the slope of one plane is traced, the co-plane can be seen to be bypassed or skipped, though in actuality the co-plane is also traced from the opposite perspective.

The helicoid is also a ruled surface (and a right conoid), meaning that it is a trace of a line. Alternatively, for any point on the surface, there is a line on the surface passing through it. Indeed, Catalan proved in 1842 that the helicoid and the plane were the only ruled minimal surfaces. 

A helicoid is also a translation surface in the sense of differential geometry.

The helicoid and the catenoid are parts of a family of helicoid-catenoid minimal surfaces.

The helicoid is shaped like Archimedes screw, but extends infinitely in all directions.  It can be described by the following parametric equations in Cartesian coordinates:

where  and  range from negative infinity to positive infinity, while  is a constant. If  is positive, then the helicoid is right-handed as shown in the figure; if negative then left-handed.

The helicoid has principal curvatures .  The sum of these quantities gives the mean curvature (zero since the helicoid is a minimal surface) and the product gives the Gaussian curvature.

The helicoid is homeomorphic to the plane .  To see this, let  decrease continuously from its given value down to zero.  Each intermediate value of  will describe a different helicoid, until  is reached and the helicoid becomes a vertical plane.

Conversely, a plane can be turned into a helicoid by choosing a line, or axis, on the plane, then twisting the plane around that axis.

If a helicoid of radius  revolves by an angle of  around its axis while rising by a height , the area of the surface is given by

Helicoid and catenoid

The helicoid and the catenoid are locally isometric surfaces; see Catenoid#Helicoid transformation.

See also
Generalized helicoid
Dini's surface
Right conoid
Ruled surface

Notes

External links

 
 WebGL-based Interactive 3D Helicoid

Geometric shapes
Minimal surfaces
Surfaces